Home of the Friendless is a historic orphanage at Baltimore, Maryland, United States. It is a three bay wide, five story high Second Empire style brick building constructed in 1870 as an orphanage. The building provided a home for orphaned and deserted children for six decades and was part of a three-building complex that housed from 100 to 200 children each year. By 1922 the Board of Managers and Trustees had decided to sell the property and move to the suburbs.  The institution is now known as Woodbourne Center.

Home of the Friendless was listed on the National Register of Historic Places in 2003.

References

External links
, including photo from 2002, at Maryland Historical Trust
Woodbourne Center website

Orphanages in Maryland
Buildings and structures on the National Register of Historic Places in Baltimore
Residential buildings completed in 1870
Upton, Baltimore